Ken MacLeod is a Scottish science fiction writer.

Ken MacLeod or Ken McLeod may also refer to:
 Ken McLeod (born 1948), Buddhist teacher
 Ken McLeod (cricketer) (born 1964), Jamaican cricketer
 K. G. MacLeod (Kenneth Grant MacLeod, 1888–1967), Scottish cricketer
 Ken MacLeod (Australian footballer) (1890–1940), Australian rules footballer
 K. G. MacLeod (1888–1967), known as Ken, Scottish international rugby union player
 Kenneth McLeod (1858–1940), politician in Alberta, Canada
 Kenneth G. McLeod (born 1962), Christian apologist and radio talk show host
 Kenneth P. MacLeod (1923–2001), American politician from Maine, USA
 Kenneth R. MacLeod (born 1955), former politician in New Brunswick, Canada
 Kenneth Roy MacLeod (1927–2011), judge and politician in Saskatchewan, Canada

See also
 Donald Kenneth McLeod (1885–1958), officer in the British Army